Norman Osborn is a  fictional character appearing in American comic books published by Marvel Comics. The character, created by writer Stan Lee and artist Steve Ditko, first appeared in The Amazing Spider-Man #14 (July 1964) as the first and best-known incarnation of the Green Goblin. He has endured as one of Spider-Man's most prominent villains, and is regarded as one of his three archenemies, alongside Doctor Octopus and Venom.

Osborn is depicted as an amoral industrialist head of science conglomerate Oscorp and the father of Harry Osborn, the best friend of Spider-Man's alter ego Peter Parker. Osborn, in part as a reaction to the death of his wife, maintains a cold disposition and is obsessed with attaining as much power as possible. As a result, he treats his son coldly and openly favors Peter for his intellect, leading Harry to often try and compensate. In his origin, Norman was exposed to an experimental formula which enhanced his physical abilities and intellect, but also drove him to insanity. As the Goblin, he adopted a Halloween-themed appearance: dressing in a goblin costume, riding on a bat-shaped "Goblin Glider", and using an arsenal of high-tech weapons, such as grenade-like "Pumpkin Bombs", to terrorize New York City. 

Osborn has been part of many of Spider-Man's defining stories, most notably "The Night Gwen Stacy Died" and the "Clone Saga". While his primary foe is Spider-Man, Osborn has often come into conflict with Iron Man, Captain America and other superheroes in the Marvel Universe. Although Osborn sometimes works with other supervillains such as Doctor Doom and Loki and groups like the Sinister Six and the Dark Avengers, these relationships often collapse due to his desire for unbridled power. Osborn's largest overarching story came during the line-wide "Dark Reign" and Siege comic book events, in which he served as the main antagonist; during this time, he became the original iteration of Iron Patriot. 

The character has been in various top villain lists as one of Spider-Man's greatest enemies and one of the greatest comic book villains of all time. The character's popularity has seen him appear on a variety of merchandise, inspire real-world structures (such as theme park attractions) and be referenced in a number of media. He has been adapted to serve as Spider-Man's adversary in live-action, animated, and video game incarnations. Willem Dafoe played the character in Sam Raimi's Spider-Man film trilogy and reprised the role in the Marvel Cinematic Universe film Spider-Man: No Way Home (2021), while Chris Cooper played the character in the film The Amazing Spider-Man 2 (2014).

Publication history

Marvel Comics editor and head writer Stan Lee and artist Steve Ditko are credited with creating the character; they each collaborated with one another on how the character would be portrayed. According to Ditko: "Stan's synopsis for the Green Goblin had a movie crew, on location, finding an Egyptian-like sarcophagus. Inside was an ancient, mythological demon, the Green Goblin. He naturally came to life. On my own, I changed Stan's mythological demon into a human villain".

The Green Goblin debuted in The Amazing Spider-Man #14. At this time his identity was unknown, but he proved popular and reappeared in later issues, which made a point of his secret identity. According to both Stan Lee and John Romita, Sr., who replaced Ditko as the title's artist, Lee always wanted the Green Goblin to be someone Peter Parker knew, while Ditko wanted his civilian identity to be someone who had not yet been introduced. Lee elaborated: "Steve wanted him to turn out to be just some character that we had never seen before. Because, he said, in real life, very often a villain turns out to be somebody that you never knew. And I felt that that would be wrong. I felt, in a sense, it would be like cheating the reader. ... if it's somebody you didn't know and had never seen, then what was the point of following all the clues? I think that frustrates the reader". However, Lee prefaced this statement by admitting that, due to his self-professed poor memory, he may have been confusing the Green Goblin with a different character, and in an earlier essay he had said that he could not remember whether Norman Osborn being the Green Goblin was his idea or Ditko's. Ditko has maintained that it was his idea, even claiming that he had decided on it before the first Green Goblin story was finished. Though Osborn would not be introduced by name until The Amazing Spider-Man #37, Ditko has said that a character he drew in the background of two panels in issue #23 was intended to be Osborn, seeded in advance of the reveal. Lending credence to Ditko's claim, this then-nameless character—a member of a businessmen's club and a friend of J. Jonah Jameson—reappeared in a scene in The Amazing Spider-Man #25, visiting Jameson at his office, then again in the businessman's club in #26 and #27, and when Norman was formally introduced in issue #37, he too was stated to be a member of the club and friend of Jameson's.

Ditko left the series with issue #38, just one issue after Norman Osborn was introduced as the father of Harry Osborn. The first issue without Ditko saw the Green Goblin unmasked. John Romita, Sr., who replaced Ditko as the title's artist, recalled:

In the landmark story "The Night Gwen Stacy Died" (The Amazing Spider-Man #121-122), the Green Goblin kills Gwen Stacy and later dies in a fight against Spider-Man. However, the story's writer, Gerry Conway, had Harry Osborn adopt the Green Goblin identity in the aftermath of "The Night Gwen Stacy Died", later remarking that "I never had any intention of getting rid of the Green Goblin as a concept". Harry Osborn's becoming the Green Goblin was mostly well received, with fans remarking that Harry was more menacing than his father had ever been. Writer Roger Stern later introduced the Hobgoblin to replace the Green Goblin as Spider-Man's archenemy.

Return
During the "Clone Saga", a retcon was made, which determined that Norman Osborn survived the events of The Amazing Spider-Man #122 and had been playing a behind-the-scenes role in Spider-Man's adventures since then. During the "Clone Saga", the Spider-Man writers were met with a massive outcry from many readers after the decision to replace Peter Parker with his clone Ben Reilly as the true Spider-Man. Eventually, the writers decided to reveal that one of Spider-Man's arch-enemies had been manipulating events from behind the scenes. The initial plan was to use Mephisto, but they felt a more down-to-earth character was needed. It was then suggested that the semi-zombified cyborg "Gaunt" be revealed as Harry Osborn (who was killed in The Spectacular Spider-Man #200).

Gaunt was a late entry to the controversial storyline, created mainly as a plot device to return Harry to life; the plan for the character included Harry regaining his humanity, taking credit for tricking Peter into thinking he was a clone, and assuming his father's Green Goblin identity. However, this narrative was rejected by newly promoted editor in chief Bob Harras, and eventually Norman was chosen to be the mastermind. Following the Clone Saga, Green Goblin re-established himself as a supervillain and Spider-Man's nemesis, serving as the main antagonist of several arcs thereafter.

Osborn returns in Peter Parker: Spider-Man #75 and is blown up at the end of the issue. It is shown in The Spectacular Spider-Man #250 that he has recovered, and he returns to his civilian life. Without the Green Goblin identity, Osborn would then go on to attack Spider-Man indirectly, through minions and via smear campaigns designed to portray him as a monster. However, Norman would still wear his Green Goblin costume when needed.

New roles
When Spider-Man revealed his public identity, Osborn is apprehended by S.H.I.E.L.D. agents in Paris. Following the Civil War story arc, Warren Ellis began writing Thunderbolts, and Osborn was brought into this title as the director of the eponymous team. He was one of several characters offered to Ellis, who picked him because, according to Thunderbolts editor Molly Lazer, "[t]here was something about Norman, his instability, and his fixation with Spider-Man that Warren liked, so he's in the book!" Ellis admitted not being very familiar with the character, saying: "All I remember of the Norman Osborn character was from the Spider-Man reprints my parents used to buy me when I was very young, and Norman Osborn was this guy with a weird rippled crewcut who was always sweating and his eyes were always bulging out of his head. That guy as a Donald Rumsfeld-like public governmental figure... [Joe Quesada] talked me into writing the book while I was still laughing".
Lazer confirmed that the new team was answerable to the Commission on Superhuman Activities, giving him the opportunity to do what he wanted: "He's a free man with a lot of power .... And his agenda, well, it's not that secret. He wants to get Spider-Man".

Writer Christos Gage took over for the Secret Invasion tie-in stories, which end with Osborn taking credit for the defeat of the Skrulls after he kills the Skrull queen Veranke. This allowed the character to be placed into an influential position in the aftermath of Dark Reign. Although the dark turn at the end was always part of the plan for the storyline, Brian Michael Bendis, Secret Invasion's writer, says that Osborn was picked for the leading role because of the changes implemented by Ellis.

Meanwhile, Andy Diggle took over the writing of Thunderbolts. He introduced new characters to serve as Osborn's black ops team, explaining:

He appeared as a regular character in the Dark Avengers series from issue #1 (March 2009) through issue #16 (June 2010), as well as the mini-series "Siege", which saw Norman being arrested for his crimes, following the events of the Civil War storyline.

The first was "Brand New Ways To Die" which featured Norman and the Thunderbolts versus Spider-Man and the original Venom. His second appearance explained that following Mephisto's alteration of Spider-Man's past, Norman's return was significantly altered. He had returned earlier than he had originally, and, due to concern for his son's mental wellbeing after once again being the Green Goblin, had arranged for Harry's death to be faked, with help from Mysterio. In his final appearance in the storyline, Norman attempts to convince Harry to become a super-hero so that Norman can kill his son off and exploit said demise. It is also revealed that he was sleeping with the supervillain Menace (Harry's ex-girlfriend), with Norman believing that the villain's child she was carrying was his.

A five issue mini-series followed, written by writer Kelly Sue DeConnick and artist Emma Rios. The mini-series would lead into a dual storyline running in the pages of The New Avengers #17–24 and The Avengers vol. 4 #18–24, in which the character formed a new version of the Dark Avengers and ultimately garnered new powers, having turned himself into a Super-Adaptoid.

Fictional character biography

Early life
Norman was born in New Haven, Connecticut as the son of wealthy industrialist Amberson Osborn. Amberson, a brilliant student in the fields of science, became an alcoholic after losing control of a manufacturing company and fortune, and became physically abusive toward the family. Norman quickly came to despise his father, resolving to be a better breadwinner while developing early homicidal tendencies as a means of relieving the stress of his father's abuse.

In college, where he studied chemistry, business administration, and electrical engineering, Norman meets his college sweetheart, who eventually marries him and has their son Harold "Harry" Osborn. In his adulthood, with the help of his college professor Mendel Stromm, he co-founds the chemical company Oscorp Industries and establishes himself as CEO and President. The company was hugely successful, and Norman re-gained the wealth that he had lost during his childhood. However, his wife becomes ill and dies when Harry is barely a year old, the stress of which pushes Norman to work harder, leading him to emotionally neglect Harry.

Hoping to gain more control of Oscorp Industries, Osborn accused Stromm of embezzlement and has his partner arrested and shares in his company sold to him. Searching his former mentor's possessions, Norman discovers an experimental strength/intelligence enhancement formula, but in attempting to create the serum, it turns green and explodes in his face. The accident greatly increases his intelligence and physical abilities as intended, but also has the side-effect of driving him into self-destructive insanity, just like his father from years ago.

The original Green Goblin

Norman adopts the Green Goblin identity with the goal of being the leader of organized crime in New York City, and intends to cement his position by defeating Spider-Man. Acting on his own as the Goblin, or through his employment of other super-criminals such as the Headsman, he would harass Spider-Man many times, but fail to achieve his goal. Soon, Stromm returns from prison, and attempts to exact revenge on Osborn using an army of robots, but Norman is saved by Spider-Man, and Stromm apparently dies of a heart attack.

In order to discover his nemesis's secret identity, Osborn exposes Spider-Man to a gas that nullifies the hero's spider-senses. This allows Osborn to stalk Spider-Man until he learns that his nemesis is Peter Parker, a college student and his son's classmate and best friend. While Parker is going about civilian life, Osborn surprises and knocks Parker out with an asphyxiation grenade, taking the youth to his waterfront base. After unmasking himself to Parker, the latter goads him into recounting how he became the Goblin, and uses the time to break free. In the ensuing battle, Spider-Man accidentally knocks Osborn into a mass of electrical wires, wiping out his memory. Feeling sorry for his nemesis, and wishing to avoid the shame that would befall the Osborn family (especially Parker's best friend Harry), Spider-Man destroys the Goblin costume in the resulting fire and tells the authorities that Osborn lost his memory while helping to defeat the Goblin.

Soon, Osborn is troubled by repressed memories of the Goblin and Spider-Man. After a presentation on supervillains by NYPD Captain George Stacy restores Osborn's memory, he experiences a brief return to his Goblin persona. While abducting Parker's friends and threatening Parker's elderly aunt, he is exposed to one of his own "psychedelic bombs", causing a relapse of amnesia.

Later, Osborn stumbles upon an old Goblin hideout which, again, restores his memory. However, the shock of seeing Harry hospitalized, overdosed on drugs, causes Osborn's amnesia to return once more. After the final restoration of his memories, the Goblin kidnaps and takes Gwen Stacy to a bridge. During Spider-Man's rescue attempt, Osborn knocks Gwen off the bridge, resulting in the girl's death. Spider-Man, traumatised and obsessed with revenge, tracks the Goblin to his hideout, and in the ensuing battle, Osborn is impaled by his own goblin glider and dies.

Return
Since his presumed death, Osborn had been retroactively established as an unseen character. While he lies in the morgue, it is revealed that the Goblin formula gave him a previously-unknown healing factor which restores him to life; in the process of sneaking out, he kills a homeless man with a similar physique to himself for clothing and to feign his death. No longer suffering from bouts of amnesia, Norman escapes to Europe, where he can move freely and unnoticed (as later revealed, he was in France for some time). During this time abroad, believed dead by the general public, he orchestrates several plots, including replacing May Parker with a genetically altered actress, and faking his own son's death (after Mephisto's manipulations of the timeline); prior to the timeline change, Harry's corpse, at one point, was exhumed and tested.

Most significantly, however, he utilizes his fortune to build a vast network of criminals, spies, dupes and co-conspirators to help engineer what would be an almost impossibly complex and meticulously planned plot to destroy Spider-Man's life. To achieve this, he's the leader of the Scrier cabal, taking as his pawns Seward Trainer, Judas Traveller, the Jackal and the cyborg Gaunt, all of whom he utilizes to carry out revenge against Parker. It is this group of individuals who are crucial in duping Parker into believing that the youth is actually a clone of himself created by Jackal, while claiming that the clone – who comes to be known as Ben Reilly – is actually the original. Frustrated by Parker's perseverance despite everything that's been inflicted, Osborn publicly reveals that he's alive on Halloween. During the battle that ensues between the two, Osborn attempts to kill Parker by impaling his nemesis with his goblin glider. When Reilly sacrifices himself to save Parker from Osborn (and immediately deteriorates upon death as all of the Jackal's clones do), Parker makes his discovery of actually being the original. During this same period, Osborn was also responsible for the murder or abduction of Peter & Mary Jane's newborn daughter, after one of his allies apparently caused the stillbirth of the baby.

Returning to his former seat of power, Osborn regains control of his business and also buys out the Daily Bugle, humiliating former friend and societal peer J. Jonah Jameson as the latter no longer has control over the newspaper. He also torments Ben Urich and demands a retraction over an exposé of his time as the Goblin, providing faked evidence that he never was the supervillain, despite Urich's extensive research. However, he saves his most sadistic treatment for Peter, acting not only as a constant reminder of all the pain he's inflicted on his nemesis over the years, but a looming threat that could strike at any time. This build-up of pressure eventually makes Spider-Man snap by savagely beating the civilian and non-resistant Osborn in front of the latter's CCTV, which, combined with Osborn convincing the Trapster to frame Spider-Man for murder, results in Spider-Man being a fugitive again. To get around this, Peter adopts four new identities, using two of these identities to convince Trapster to expose Osborn's scheme, and provide fake evidence that the individual that beat up Osborn was an impostor.

For a time, Osborn retires his costumed persona and uses a stand-in so as not to be suspected of being the Green Goblin. This fifth Goblin kidnaps Norman's grandson and clashes with the wanted and injured Spider-Man. Norman also crosses paths with Roderick Kingsley and initiates a hostile takeover of Kingsley's corporate empire, in retaliation for raiding the Goblin's arsenal and identity. While his stand-in is masquerading as the Goblin, Osborn joins a cult, hoping to receive great power from the 'Gathering of Five', which will grant the participants Power, Knowledge, Immortality, Madness or Death, but while he believes that he will receive Power, he is instead given Madness, which worsens his already mental instability, and threatens the world with genetic bombs. It is during this time that Peter learns May is alive and Osborn's actress died in May's place. Osborn's complete madness is evident, as he hallucinates unmasking and killing Peter; yet in reality Peter easily defeats him. He is rescued from custody thereafter by his cabal of henchmen.

A few months later, the highly unstable Osborn has partially regained his sanity with the help of anti-psychotic drugs. He comes to see Parker as the son he had always wanted and attempts to have Parker take on the Green Goblin mantle using physiological torture, but ultimately fails. Osborn's next plan involves using Flash Thompson drive drunk a truck into Midtown High School, resulting in an accident that causes Thompson brain damage. This successfully enrages Parker into what Osborn anticipates will be a climactic battle. During this confrontation, the emotionally weary Parker tells Osborn of being tired of their constant battle, and declares a truce.

Osborn's Goblin identity is revealed to the public once again through an investigation by Jessica Jones, after Osborn murders one of the reporters from the Daily Bugle. After a battle with Spider-Man and Luke Cage, Osborn is arrested and sent to prison for the first time. However, things were far from over. From behind bars, Osborn again masterminded a plan against Spider-Man. This time, he has MacDonald "Mac" Gargan as Scorpion kidnap May. The plan was for Spider-Man to break Osborn out of prison in exchange for Parker's aunt's life. Peter reluctantly agreed and with the help of the Black Cat proceeded to break Osborn out, only to have twelve of his greatest enemies waiting on the outside.

Osborn had assembled a team of supervillains. However, Mary Jane Watson had contacted S.H.I.E.L.D., and the villains were faced not only by Spider-Man, but the combined might of Captain America, Iron Man, Yellowjacket, Daredevil and the Fantastic Four. During the fracas, the Goblin manages to escape and kidnap Mary Jane, taking Peter's love interest to the George Washington Bridge in order to replay the murder of the last love interest. However, Doctor Octopus intervenes, attacking the Goblin. Spider-Man is able to save Mary Jane after a bolt of lightning sends the two villains into the river. Following some verbal clues from the Goblin, Peter also discovers where he had hidden May, and rescues the latter as well. It is revealed that Osborn sent Peter a letter before the fight, thanking Peter for giving his life meaning and purpose, but Peter never received the letter due to moving to a different residence.

Years after Gwen's death, it is revealed that Osborn had a one-night stand with Gwen, which led to Gwen's pregnancy with his illegitimate twin children. Osborn thus has three motives for killing Gwen; revenge against Spider-Man, to prevent Gwen from talking of their affair and creating a scandal, and to take their children to raise by himself, thus being his ideal heirs. Mary Jane was the only person who knew of their encounter and their children's existence prior to Gwen's death, despising Osborn for his immoral behaviors long before discovering he's the villainous Goblin. Gabriel and Sarah (who rapidly aged to adulthood years because of the Goblin formula in their genes) return to attack Peter as Osborn has the twins believe that Peter is the twins' father who abandoned the two and responsible for Gwen's death to which Peter learned the details of Gwen's past with Osborn and the twins from Mary Jane. Peter is able to convince Sarah of Osborn's villainy, the truth of Sarah's paternity and circumstances of Gwen's death, and stabilized the Goblin physiology with a blood transfusion due to Peter's blood type matching Sarah's. Meanwhile, Gabriel personally learns the truth of his relation to Osborn after watching a video message at one of the Goblin lairs, aligning with his father to stabilize his own condition using a variation of the Goblin formula at the cost of sanity. All of this was retconned during the Sinister War story-arc, when AI version of Harry Osborn's mind reveals that he masterminded a plan to get revenge of both his father and Peter Parker: he created the twins in a lab with the help of Mendel Stromm and he brainwashed Norman and Mary Jane Watson (thanks to Mysterio) into believing Gwen cheated on Peter with Osborn. The twins aged rapidly because of clonation issues (and not because of Osborn's Goblin Serum), but eventually got better just as Harry started to use them as soldiers for his war against Norman and Spider-Man.

H.A.M.M.E.R. and the Dark Avengers

Osborn attempts to distance himself from his Green Goblin persona after being prescribed medication for his mental state. During the "Civil War" over the Superhuman Registration Act, Osborn is appointed director of the Thunderbolts superhero team, now tasked to apprehend anyone who resists registering. While in this capacity, he directs the Thunderbolts to apprehend or kill Spider-Man, but after Mephisto changes reality, Harry Osborn is alive once more, and no one (including Norman) knows Spider-Man's secret identity. In the end, Spider-Man manages to evade this coordinated attack and escape.

During the "Secret Invasion" by shape-shifting extraterrestrials, the Skrulls, Osborn shoots and kills the Skrull queen Veranke. He leverages this widely publicized success, positioning himself as the new director of the S.H.I.E.L.D.-like paramilitary force H.A.M.M.E.R. to advance his agenda, while using his public image to start his own Dark Avengers, substituting Moonstone for Ms. Marvel, Bullseye for Hawkeye, Gargan for Spider-Man, Daken for Wolverine and Noh-Varr for Captain Marvel, as well as manipulating Ares and the Sentry into helping to further his cause. Osborn himself leads the Dark Avengers as the Iron Patriot, a suit of armor fashioned by himself after Iron Man's armor with Captain America's colors. Osborn simultaneously forms the Cabal alliance with Doctor Doom, Emma Frost, Namor, Loki and the Hood, but this 'alliance' quickly falls apart when Namor and Frost betray the Cabal to aid the X-Men. Norman's attempts to exert his authority are increasingly jeopardized by various superheroes. After the Superhuman Registration Act records are deleted so that Osborn has no access to the information recorded about heroes after it was implemented, Osborn attacked the brain-damaged Tony Stark, thus showing Osborn brutally assaulting a physically and mentally incapable individual that was not even attempting to strike back. After the New Avengers are forced to allow Osborn to capture Cage when needing medical treatment, the team uses a tracking device Osborn had planted in Luke to trick him into blowing up his own house after rescuing Cage from Osborn's custody.

Harry is approached by Norman with the offer of a job within the Dark Avengers. Norman welcomes Harry into Avengers Tower, wanting to make his son into the American Son. When Harry finds a cure for Lily Hollister's Goblin condition for their baby's safety, Lily reveals that it is a ruse to coerce Harry into taking the American Son armor, whom Norman had plotted would die in a tragedy to increase sympathy for Norman and his Dark Avengers. When Lily also reveals that the baby is not Harry's but in fact Norman's, Harry dons his American Son armor, and fights Norman in his Iron Patriot armor. During the battle, Norman declares that Harry is no longer his son, and that he has bred a better child to replace the 'failure' of Harry. After further taunts from Norman, Harry lashes out and defeats his father, declaring "I was never your son!". When Harry has the option of killing Norman, Spider-Man says to decapitate him, since Norman's healing factor may repair a blow to the head. Spider-Man also cautions Harry that killing Norman will cause Harry to "become the son Norman always wanted". Harry instead backs down, and turns away from his father forever.

At Loki's suggestion, Osborn creates a rationale to invade Asgard, claiming the world (which was, at the time, positioned at the outskirts of Broxton, Oklahoma) poses a national security threat, by sending the U-Foes to attack Volstagg in Chicago, leading to the destruction of Soldier Field. During a pitched battle with several superheroes, Sentry causes Thor's world to fall to Earth. Osborn fights with the recently resurrected Steve Rogers, however, Stark removes Osborn's Iron Patriot armor remotely, revealing Osborn used green facepaint to create a goblin-like look. Osborn screams that the Avengers do not know what they have done, only for Spider-Man to knock him down. He tells them they are all dead as the Void is released. Osborn knocks out Rogers and tries to escape, but is captured by Volstagg. Incarcerated in the Raft penitentiary, he blames his Goblin alter-ego for ruining his chance to protect the world.

When transferred to a secret underwater government base, Osborn takes steps to ensure his release from prison. He uses a group of followers known as the "Green Goblin Cult" to break out with the aid of corrupt senators; he plans to turn himself in after killing his fellow escapees, setting him up as a 'champion' of the judicial system. After the breakout, he awaits his trial in a new prison, this one controlled by his cult members. Using his staged persona as a voice for the 'disenfranchised', Osborn plans to regain the Iron Patriot armor and creates a new team of Dark Avengers, this time substituting June Covington for Scarlet Witch, Ai Apaec for Spider-Man, Barney Barton for Hawkeye, Skaar for Hulk, Superia for Ms. Marvel, Gorgon for Wolverine and the A.I.M.-rebuilt Ragnarok for Thor. In the team's first fight with the New Avengers, Osborn reveals himself as the Super-Adaptoid, declares himself the head of world security, and orders that the Avengers be arrested for war crimes. However, double agent Skaar betrays Osborn, allowing the Avengers to dogpile Osborn's body, overloading him with superpowers and sending him into a coma. A.I.M. and HYDRA pick up Osborn's leftover resources, and H.A.M.M.E.R. is disbanded. After the Hobgoblin returns to New York, a nurse and doctor are called to Norman's hospital room, only to find him gone.

The Goblin King
When the children that work for the Vulture are discussing what to do after Superior Spider-Man (Otto Octavius's mind in Spider-Man's body) brutally defeats the Vulture, the Green Goblin approaches and tells the group that he will be the one that crushes Superior Spider-Man. The Goblin is later shown having gathered a new gang of followers together in the sewers formed from discarded members of other villains' gangs like Vulture, Owl, and the third White Dragon's gangs. These henchmen escaped their organizations unharmed because Superior Spider-Man is more focused on the larger threats (where the original Spider-Man would focus on individuals).

As he builds this army to attack Superior Spider-Man, he takes on the new alias of the Goblin King. The Hand ninjas who evaded capture arrive at the sewers and join up with the Goblin Nation. The group reveals in the news that, thanks to Superior Spider-Man's assault, Osborn now owns over half of New York's organized crime. He claims he now owns New York City as the Goblin Kingpin of Crime. With Menace's help, Osborn later releases Phil Urich from a prison transport and upgrades Urich's Goblin armor and weapons, asking in return only that Urich's only identity from here on shall be Goblin Knight. Osborn trains Goblin Knight, anxious to confront Superior Spider-Man. Osborn later poses as the Hobgoblin and is sighted by some of the Spiderlings.

Upon Carlie Cooper being brought to his lair by Menace, he receives Carlie's journal from Menace which reveals to him that Otto's mind is in Spider-Man's body. Osborn douses Carlie with the Goblin formula, causing the woman to mutate into the new superhuman villain Monster. He demands to know Spider-Man's identity, but Monster first asks the Goblin to reveal his own identity. He assures Monster that he is Norman, but refuses to remove his Goblin mask until Carlie has proven a loyal follower and dispatches Monster and Menace on a mission. Osborn battles and kills Hobgoblin, although it is revealed to be a servant with Kingsley still in hiding abroad which Goblin Knight discovers.

Having staged a coup of New York after spreading his resources by exploiting Otto's reliance on technology, Osborn directly confronts Superior Spider-Man, angry that he was cheated out of the opportunity to defeat his enemy, but offering Otto the chance to join him and Otto rejects the offer. When Otto finds being unable to win against Osborn's resources, having had various allies abandoned, and with faith in his own abilities gone, Otto sacrifices himself to restore the original Spider-Man's mind in order to save Anna Maria Marconi. When Spider-Man arrives for the final confrontation, Osborn quickly realizes that the original personality is back in control when Spider-Man responds to his nemesis' taunts with his own wisecracks. In the duel that follows, Spider-Man unmasks Osborn, learning that he has undergone plastic surgery to change his appearance, acting as Alchemax's CEO and intending to re-establish himself as businessman Mason Banks, now that his true likeness is too publicly known as a supervillain. Spider-Man defeats and strips the villain's powers with Otto's serum, but Norman manages to escape through Liz Allan's discreet aid. In hiding once again, he reflects that the various heroes will be unprepared for him when he returns with a new identity and approach as a businessman, seemingly no longer afflicted by the mental illness associated with the Goblin formula.

All New, All Different Marvel
Osborn's Goblin King position was quickly usurped by Phil Urich. However, a mysterious man with a bandaged face is soon shown to be selling Goblin-based weaponry globally to attack Parker Industries. This man reveals himself to be Norman alive again post-Secret Wars and still planning on getting revenge on Spider-Man. He is revealed to have played a part in the recent coup of Symkaria. He restores a semblance of his original features via a twisted form of plastic surgery but which also resembles the Green Goblin's facets, and intends to release a modified version of the Goblin formula to turn the whole country into Goblin-powered soldiers programmed to be loyal to him.

However, in his final confrontation with Spider-Man, despite exposing his foe to a series of gases to temporarily neutralize all of his powers, and triggering an EMP to shut down all the gadgetry within his new Spider-armor, Spider-Man is still able to defeat Osborn as the two clash. Managing to escape while Peter is distracted, Osborn resolves to find a means of restoring his powers, concluding that he has only ever defeated Spider-Man when allowing himself to draw on his inner demons.

Go Down Swinging
The apparent first step in this plan occurs with Osborn managing to steal the Carnage symbiote from an abandoned S.H.I.E.L.D. storehouse while Spider-Man is occupied with the return of Zodiac. Osborn's efforts to control the Carnage symbiote initially backfire when he merges with it and finds himself overwhelmed by the urge to kill rather than his own prior plan to direct its power against Spider-Man specifically, but he is able to convince it to let him have control in favor of trying something other than its usual mindless slaughter. While interrogating a captive Jameson for information on Spider-Man, Osborn takes a brief interval from the torture to kill the self-proclaimed Goblin King who tried to raid one of his old storehouses. After Osborn appeared as the Green Goblin, Jameson mentioned how he could not stop Spider-Man since even throwing Gwen off the bridge did not stop him from fighting back. Those words caused Norman to remember that Spider-Man is Peter Parker. Attacking the Daily Bugle in his familiar Goblin attire, Osborn gives the rest of the staff time to evacuate as he fights Peter before revealing his new bond with Carnage, proclaiming himself to be the Red Goblin, driving Spider-Man away with 'Carnage bombs' that injure his leg. Discovering a sound-transmitting spider-tracer planted on him, Osborn uses this to deliver a 'devil's bargain' to Peter; if Peter abandons the Spider-Man identity and never performs any further heroics, Osborn will leave Parker alone, but the second he sees any sign of Spider-Man's return, he will kill everyone in Peter's life. Peter places the Spider-Man top on a flagpole so that Osborn can see it burn but privately vows that he will find a way to defeat Osborn as Peter rather than Spider-Man. Peter is able to contact various allies like Human Torch, Clash, Silk, Miles Morales, and Agent Anti-Venom to watch over his loved ones. When Norman moves against the Osborns and proves immune to Carnage's traditional weaknesses of Human Torch's fire and Clash's sound devices, Peter is forced to step back into action despite the injured leg, with Agent Anti-Venom sacrificing a chance to get back into action himself to heal Spider-Man's injury as Osborn merges a part of the Carnage symbiote with his grandson Normie turning into a miniature version of Red Goblin.

Normie goes after May but she gets some unexpected help in the form of Superior Octopus and J. Jonah Jameson who uses an old Spider-Slayer, however, both are defeated by Norman. Soon afterward, Normie watches as his grandfather throws Liz through a window only to be rescued by Spider-Man which causes Normie to turn on Norman. Norman reveals to Spider-Man he infected some of Peter's friends and family with slivers of the Carnage symbiote which he could send to their brain to kill them. However, it turns out that Flash has figured out Spider-Man's secret identity too and went to May and Mary Jane in order to remove those ticking time bombs. Flash then takes the fight to Norman and while it appears as if he's gaining the upper hand, it turns out that Norman still has some Green Goblin tech beneath the Carnage symbiote and he uses that to electrocute Flash. Flash's injuries prove to be fatal and die in Spider-Man's arms. Spider-Man confronts Norman at Times Square as Red Goblin gains the upper hand. Peter manages to hold him off by pointing out that it's not the Goblin killing the Spider, but rather Carnage and Cletus Kasady. The villain is enraged by this and when Peter removes the Venom symbiote and to challenge him, Norman takes off the Carnage symbiote to reveal his old Green Goblin persona. Spider-Man manages to take his foe down and when the villain begs the Carnage symbiote to help him, the wall-crawler seemingly destroys it by hitting it with an exploding gas tank. However, the Carnage symbiote was attached to Norman when Peter destroyed it, and he wonders what sort of effect that might have had on his old foe's mind. Norman is last seen incarcerated at Ravencroft and believes that Spider-Man is Osborn and he is Kasady.

Absolute Carnage
When Kasady starts hunting all former symbiote hosts to extract the samples of the symbiote codex left in them with the goal of awakening a symbiote god as seen in the "Absolute Carnage" storyline, Spider-Man and Venom attempt to retrieve Osborn from Ravencroft to test a machine that can extract the codex from former hosts, as the Maker is uncertain of potential side-effects. However, Carnage attacks Ravencroft as they attempt to retrieve Osborn, transforming most of the patients into his drone soldiers and turning Osborn into another version of Carnage due to him still believing himself to be Kasady. As Spider-Man works to keep Normie Osborn and Dylan Brock safe, a flashback showed that Kindred had visited Norman Osborn in Ravencroft. He quoted that Norman looked down on the citizens of New York from his tower and states that he could have his centipedes rip him apart if he wanted them to. Kindred even made a reference to how he appeared in Mary Jane's nightmares and how he would not be able to kill Spider-Man as Kindred states that he "already won a long time ago." Back in the present, Norman has defeated Spider-Man. In the rest of the flashback, Kindred sent one of his centipedes into Osborn's head in order to save him from himself. Back in the present, Osborn's Carnage form feels a scratching in his head as he tells Kindred to let him be the one to kill Spider-Man. He then turns his target towards Dylan Brock and Normie. Spider-Man gets to his feet and defeats Norman. As more of the flashback is shown, Kindred states to Norman that he will leave now and will return when Norman is himself again so that they can confront the truth together. As Kindred starts to leave, Norman's Kasady persona states to Kindred that he has a message for him from Norman who states that he is "so proud of him". Kindred takes his leave as Norman's Kasady breaks out in maniacal laughter. After the Grendel symbiote left Norman Osborn's body, Norman regained conscious and escaped during the final showdown with Carnage.

At some point, Norman's mind recovered and he joined the Power Elite.

In the pages of "Ravencroft", Norman Osborn regained his sanity by blaming his actions on the Carnage symbiote to J.A.N.U.S. and became a consultant at Ravencroft at the behest of Mayor Wilson Fisk during its rebuilding. One of his assignments is to help John Jameson regain the ability to become Man-Wolf so that he can become an asset ranging from having Mister Hyde attack him to creating a clone of Ashley Kafka. In addition, Norman stole the Journal of Jonas Ravencroft to give to J.A.N.U.S. to use. When the Unwanted who lived beneath Ravencroft for years attacked, Norman succeeded in his goal to have John Jameson turn into Man-Wolf in order to fight the Unwanted. J.A.N.U.S.' leaders were pleased with Osborn's success enabling them to use the items in the basement.

Sin Eater's resurrection and Last Remains

During the "Sins Rising" arc, Mayor Wilson Fisk promoted Norman Osborn to becoming the director of Ravencroft where he found himself being targeted by a resurrected Sin-Eater. When Sin-Eater's army of followers attacked Ravencroft, Norman was rescued by Spider-Man. As Sin-Eater uses his abilities to steal the powers of Mister Negative to corrupt the guards, Norman takes Spider-Man to a bunker in his old cell and finds the items within them gone as the footage as he sees a corrupted Kafka be used to free Juggernaut so that he can steal his powers. Norman reveals that he was planning to use the weapons to counter Kindred who is after both of them. This leads to Norman removing a fake wall containing Green Goblin weaponry ready for combat. Using Juggernaut's powers, Sin-Eater and his followers pursue Spider-Man and Norman Osborn as the Order of the Web considers waiting for Sin-Eater to cleanse Norman Osborn before intervening. As Spider-Man and Norman Osborn escape underground, Sin-Eater catches up to them. As Spider-Man holds onto Sin-Eater to restrain him, Norman Osborn activates an EMP to liquefy the floor beneath them. After getting away, Norman tried to drown Spider-Man as he is saved by the Order of the Web. Upon identifying Ghost-Spider as an alternate version of Gwen Stacy and his plans to do what he did to the other Gwen Stacy, Spider-Man threw him out of the vehicle thery were in.

At the start of the "Last Remains" arc, Sin-Eater catches up to Norman Osborn and uses his gun to purge him of his sins. When Norman Osborn recovered, he was found by Kafka as most of Sin-Eater's followers are arrested. While mentioning that Ravencroft is in bad shape, Kafka is told by a remorseful Norman his suspicion that Kindred is Harry Osborn. Not wanting to give him to the police, Kafka brings Norman to her office where he confessed every bad thing that he has done in his life. When Norman still claims that Harry is Kindred and that he must find a way to stop him before he goes further down the path to vengeance, Kafka suggests to Norman that he should enlist someone who Harry would still listen to. When Mary Jane catches up to Norman Osborn and attacks him, Norman expressed his remorse for his sins that Sin-Eater purged him of which Ashley Kafka corroborated on. He claims to Mary Jane that Harry Osborn is Kindred to which Mary Jane claimed that she just saw Harry Osborn alive. It turns out that Norman Osborn faked being purged of his sins as seen when he meets up with Mayor Wilson Fisk and his men. Norman and Mayor Fisk work on a plan to dispose of Kindred for what he did to them. Norman Osborn contacts Mayor Wilson Fisk stating that Mary Jane Watson got through to Kindred. As Mary Jane offers her life in exchange for Kindred not killing the Order of the Web, Norman Osborn in his Green Goblin attire crashes the confrontation where he throws a Pumpkin Bomb near Mary Jane stating that the choice is not Kindred's choice. Then Green Goblin gives Mayor Fisk the signal to activate the trap which causes the tomb to be engulfed by a supernatural darkness. Prior to the confrontation with Kindred, Norman Osborn spoke to Mayor Wilson Fisk about Project Blank which was inspired by the Darkforce Dome that Hydra used during their takeover of the United States. They enlisted Spot to power it. Back in the present, Mary Jane revealed to Spider-Man that the Pumpkin Bomb that was thrown was a flash bomb version as Green Goblin secretly quotes to Spider-Man to evacuated his allies while wearing his mask so that Mayor Fisk will not know his true identity. At Ravencroft, Kindred's Darkforce casing is being kept together by magic while monitored by Ravencroft's staff. After some persuasion to Mayor Fisk, Norman Osborn speaks to Kindred while mentioned that he was actually cleansed by Sin-Eater while voicing regret having birthed the sickness in Harry's mind. Planning to redeem the Osborn name, Norman states to Kindred that he will find the truth that he talked about. Spider-Man arrives stating to Norman that he would like to talk to him. Spider-Man states to Norman Osborn that whenever he is cured or rebounds, somebody always dies. Norman agrees with the question and states that he wants Spider-Man to help him keep Kindred from being harmed by Mayor Wilson Fisk. When Norman continues to ask for Spider-Man and Mary Jane's help, Spider-Man beats him up and then walks out.

"Sinister War" arc reveals just like Peter Parker, after Civil War I, but before him, Norman was also a victim of a devil's deal with Mephisto, and Osborn's descent into villainy is caused by his past deal with the latter, at the cost of original Harry's soul.

Powers and abilities

Norman Osborn was turned into the Green Goblin by a chemical solution he had devised based upon a formula originally conceived by Professor Mendel Stromm. The process granted Osborn superhuman strength, speed, reflexes, and stamina as well as a low-level rapid healing factor. In addition to these physical advantages, the serum also greatly enhanced Norman's already-above average intellect, making him a bona fide genius capable of making breakthroughs in advanced areas of genetics, robotics, engineering, physics and applied chemistry. The goblin formula is also said to have driven Osborn insane; defects in his personality were strongly augmented by the serum, resulting in dangerous mood-swings and hallucinations.

Following his confrontation with the returned Spider-Man after his campaign against Otto Octavius in Spider-Man's body, Osborn has been rid of the Goblin formula from his system and thus has lost his superhuman abilities, forcing him to rely on his intellect and other natural abilities. Otto's anti-serum also prevents Osborn's attempts of restoring his powers; ultimately he seeks to rid himself of it in hopes of having them again despite risking his health and sanity. Norman bonded to the Carnage symbiote to use to expel the anti-serum from his body which restores his former powers in the process, but once more at the cost of his mind. In addition, the Carnage symbiote eliminates his physical scars including his features'.

He has since claimed to have 'perfected' the formula so that it will grant the subjects powers while also reverting those he chooses to a more basic mentality where they will accept his orders.

Weapons of Green Goblin

The Green Goblin is armed with a variety of bizarre devices. He wears a green costume underneath bulletproof chainmail with an overlapping purple tunic. His mask has a built-in gas filter to keep him safe from his own gasses. The Green Goblin's trademark weapons are his pumpkin bombs and razor bats. As their name suggests, the bombs were designed with the appearance of jack-o'-lanterns. These varied in function from smoke bombs to traditional explosives, while the razor edged bat-shaped boomerangs-could cut through very durable surfaces and materials. The gloves of the Goblin uniform were fashioned with minuscule conductors that allowed for the release of electricity at nearly 10,000 amps of an undetermined voltage. Originally, Osborn used a mechanical broomstick to fly through the air during his first few exploits as the Green Goblin. The Flying Broomstick did not last long, however, and was improved upon, creating the Goblin Glider. The Goblin Glider was a more efficient flight system than Norman's Flying Broomstick. The Glider allowed the Goblin to carry a wide array of armaments, including heat-seeking and smart missiles, machine guns, extending blades, a flamethrower and a pumpkin bomb dispenser/launcher with him as he flew and had much greater speed and mobility than the Broomstick.

Weapons as Iron Patriot
During the events of the "Dark Reign" storyline, Osborn created the Iron Patriot identity (an amalgam of Iron Man and Captain America) to cement his standing as a hero. As the Iron Patriot, he utilized an outdated version of Iron Man's armor painted in Captain America's colors. The armor featured superhuman strength, enhanced durability, flight, magnetic impact blasts, heat seeking missiles, miniaturized lasers, flamethrowers, and a communications system housed in his helmet which allowed him to interface with any U.S.-controlled satellite or computer network. While Iron Man's armor utilized repulsor technology, Osborn's design does not; all but one repulsor was destroyed as "Oz is too stupid" to make his own repulsor-based weapons system. Osborn's star shaped Uni Beam projector on his chest (because of its shape) also has a less powerful output.

Powers as Super-Adaptoid
Following his time in prison, A.I.M scientists converted Osborn into a Super-Adaptoid, capable of absorbing the abilities of any mutant, mutate, alien, android or other such superpowered being by touching them. In this form he possessed considerably increased strength and durability; where he was once approximately as strong as Spider-Man, he now possessed sufficient strength to overpower and throw Luke Cage a significant distance away from him. He could also levitate, and he was able to defeat the Vision in an aerial conflict between the two.

He is known to have absorbed the abilities of Luke Cage, Vision, Red Hulk and Protector, and it is suggested that he also absorbed the abilities of his current Dark Avengers. In his final form, his body grew to the Hulk's size, and like Hulk he was capable of creating shockwaves by hitting the ground or smashing his hands together. His durability was sufficient to withstand the combined attacks of all the Avengers, and he demonstrated remarkable healing abilities, recovering in seconds after Daisy Johnson used her powers to make his heart explode. He could also turn intangible by manipulating his density, as the Vision does.

However, Osborn had no control over his Super-Adaptoid abilities; he would automatically absorb the powers of any superhuman he touched, even if he did not consciously want to. He was also limited in how many powers his body could hold, as the A.I.M. scientists warned him that absorbing too many powers at once could overload his systems. In the end, he inadvertently absorbed the abilities of all the Avengers and New Avengers when they all touched him at once, and the unstable combination of their multiple different powers caused significant damage to his body chemistry, resulting in him going into a coma. After he regained consciousness, these powers were apparently burnt out, returning him to his Goblin-level strength instead.

Powers as Red Goblin

After gaining control of the Carnage symbiote's desire for mindless slaughter, Osborn has used it to form a new attire in the form of the Red Goblin, which essentially resembles a red version of his Green Goblin outfit without the purple and green clothing, as well as a long tail and flaming breath. With the symbiote, he can create his own Goblin Glider and what he terms 'Carnage bombs', which are essentially pumpkin bombs that can actually talk to and bite their targets before exploding, as well as the Carnage symbiote's traditional enhancements. Due to the combination of the symbiote with the new Goblin formula injected into his system, Osborn is immune to the symbiote's traditional weaknesses of fire and sound, although the touch of Anti-Venom is still dangerous to him. He also revived its ability to spread its constituent matter to others.

Characterization
Norman Osborn has consistently been depicted with several unusual weaknesses related to his psychosis and to his personality. He suffers from manic depression, has a pronounced narcissistic personality disorder co-morbid with severe anti-social psychopathic traits, and in some depictions, a form of dissociative identity disorder (DID). For some of his early appearances, he and the Goblin were separate personalities; his Goblin side disdaining his human weaknesses, while his Norman Osborn persona was primarily motivated by his concern for Harry. Although the stress caused by his son's failing health as Norman helped to provoke his transformation back into the Goblin, this supposedly separate and more compassionate side of him never reappeared after he was believed dead. Norman is also highly sadistic, showing a complete lack of empathy for the lives of innocent people who stand between him and his objectives. These weaknesses have often been referenced in stories featuring him and exploited by his enemies.

Norman Osborn is shown to be severely manic depressive. This has been referenced several times in a myriad of Spider-Man stories. When he is not under the direction of a psychiatrist and taking medication, he has dangerous mood swings. At the apex of his mania, he is paranoid, delusional, and suffers from visual and auditory hallucinations, including hearing the voice of his Green Goblin persona and seeing its face in the mirror rather than his own. Previously, Osborn's arrogance caused him to refuse to submit to psychiatric treatment unless forced to; he viewed mental illness as an imperfection and therefore would not admit that he is mentally ill. In later conversations with the Sentry, Osborn revealed that he had come to accept his own mental illness. After having rid of his powers after the confrontation with the Superior Spider-Man (Doctor Octopus), Osborn's sanity apparently restored but remains a villain.

Superhuman psychiatrist Leonard Samson says of Osborn: "In clinical terms, the words psychotic and psychopathic are far from synonymous... but in Norman Osborn's case, both apply. I'd characterise him as a bipolar psychotic with concurrent aspects of psychopathic megalomania and malignant narcissism. In layman's terms, a lethal cocktail of intersecting personality disorders that makes him one of the most dangerous human beings on the planet". There are many examples of Osborn's pronounced superiority complex, to the point that he will rarely, if ever, admit that he has made mistakes. He often transfers blame for his shortcomings to others or claims that he was better than he was; even before his accident, he spent more time providing Harry with gifts or outings rather than actually being there for his son or trying to listen to his problems, and nevertheless claims that he was still a good father, likely due to the abusive nature of his own father.

Having become the Goblin, he generally views other people as dim-witted pests, lacking in creative vision, unworthy to be graced by his presence. He goes out of his way to remind others of their personal failures and shortcomings and to remind those in close relationships with him, such as his son, that they are incapable of measuring up to his achievements. When he first learned Spider-Man's identity, he claimed that, when Spider-Man had defeated him in their previous battles, none of those victories counted because Spider-Man had only beaten his lackeys, or been rescued by the intervention of other super powered beings such as the Human Torch, despite the fact that he always departed the battles after Spider-Man's victories rather than trying to defeat his foe himself.

He also missed the opportunity to lead the original Sinister Six because he felt that joining the group would mean admitting he needed the help of others to rid himself of Spider-Man. Although he later formed the 'Sinister Twelve' when Spider-Man sent him to prison, he expressed anger at Mac Gargan for acquiring the Venom symbiote rather than using the new Scorpion suit provided for him simply because Gargan was not doing what he wanted, despite Venom being more powerful than the Scorpion. When he participated in the mystical ritual known as the Gathering of Five, he appeared convinced that he would automatically receive the gift of power from the ritual – which would bestow upon the participants power, immortality, knowledge, madness and death, respectively – only to receive the gift of madness instead, subsequently requiring an elaborate cocktail of drugs to restore himself to a semblance of sanity. During his time in charge of H.A.M.M.E.R. he was provoked into attacking Asgard by his Goblin side because his ego could not allow himself to consider the possibility that the Asgardians wouldn't threaten his power. Later events revealed that Loki at least slightly influenced Osborn's decision to further Loki's own goals. During his attempted takeover of Earth's superhuman security defenses, he was shown reflecting that humans are all barbarians who require the strong like him to control them, dismissing the Avengers as no better than him despite the obvious distinction between Osborn's demands for power and the straightforward respect that the general public have for the Avengers.

It has been shown that since having suppressed the rampaging Green Goblin personality and becoming the more dominant personality, Osborn has proven to be just as (if not more) evil and cruel. Osborn has demonstrated a high degree of sadism: while in prison, a guard once asked him for his advice in helping his critically ill wife; Osborn's advice led her to a quicker and more agonizing death. As director of H.A.M.M.E.R., he directed his officers to shoot down an airplane full of innocent people just to see whether his enemy Pepper Potts was powerful enough to rescue the passengers with her Rescue armor. His Goblin persona vied for control of his body, as depicted in the January 2010 issue of Dark Avengers, where he is shown writhing on the floor and imploring, apparently to himself, "Why won't this face come off...?", and finally took over when Osborn's Iron Patriot armor was defeated by Captain America and Iron Man at the end of the "Siege" arc. Since being cured of the Goblin formula, Osborn claims that his sanity has also been restored. However, he has expressed satisfaction at plastic surgery that 'restored' him to a twisted version of his original features, and intended to use a modified version of the formula to essentially 'infect' the entire country of Symkaria to become goblin-level soldiers without the intellectual capacity to defy him.

Alternate versions

2099 
A number of alternate universes in Marvel Comics publications allow writers to introduce variations on Osborn, in which the character's origins, behavior, and morality differ from the mainstream setting. Marvel 2099 depicts the Goblin as a radical trickster who wants to prove that Spider-Man (Miguel O'Hara) is in the pay of a megacorp. He has bat-like glider-wings and a bag of "tricks", similar to the 20th century version. He also has the ability to project illusions. In Earth X, Osborn's business ventures have completely taken over the United States. Citizens work in his businesses, shop in his stores and eat his food and is partially responsible for the deaths of the Avengers as he sent them to battle a now Super Intelligent Absorbing Man. In the Marvel Noir universe, Osborn is a former circus freak who was mistreated from the audience for his reptile-like skin disorder. This fueled his ambitions in earning his "respect" by becoming the major Crime Lord in New York. The Ultimate Marvel version of the character was an industrialist and scientist who is trying to perfect the Super Soldier drug for S.H.I.E.L.D., an obsession that leads to the neglect of his wife and son.

1602
In the Marvel: 1602 Pocket Universe, Norman Osborne appears as a major villain, attempting to find "the Source", which is guarded by the Natives of Roanoke Island, and utilize it to gain unimaginable power; to achieve his goal, Osborne allies with King James I of England and makes several attempts to create conflict between his fellow American colonists and the Natives. Ultimately, Osborne is captured and imprisoned in stocks after peace between the colonists and Natives resumes and the English are forced from America.

In Spider-Man: 1602, Osborne has been released from the stocks, and is now harbourmaster of Roanoke. When Peter Parquagh and Virginia Dare find evidence he is plotting against the natives again, he kills Virginia and exposes Peter's secret identity as The Spider. He is sentenced to be sent back to England, where capital punishment is still practiced. When the Mayflower is attacked by the pirate Wilson Fisk, Osborne's cell is hit by a cannonball. Covered in gangrenous wounds, his sentence is abandoned since he is not expected to live long enough to stand trial in England. He contacts the natural philosopher Henri Le Pym, asking to be cured in return for helping Pym acquire some of Peter's blood for his experiments.

Le Pym's attempts to cure Osborne mutate him into a winged, green-skinned creature, and he uses these powers to capture Parquagh. During his final battle with Parquagh (in which Osborne uses exploding spherical vials as projectiles in combat) he is killed by a crossbow bolt fired by Fisk's first mate, the Bull's Eye, who has also been hunting Parquagh.

Age of Apocalypse
In the Age of Apocalypse reality, Norman Osborn, known as Red, is a terrorist traitor to the human race, a member of Apocalypse's Marauders along with Dirigible, the Owl and Arcade. Red, along with the rest of the Marauders, is eventually killed by Clint Barton and Gwen Stacy.

Amalgam Comics
In the Amalgam Comics continuity, Green Goblin was combined with DC's Two-Face to create the Two-Faced Goblin (Harvey Osborn). He originally looked like the Green Goblin when in costume and had Two-Face's half-scarred face under his Goblin mask, but in Dark Claw Adventures #1, he was given a different design with a glider that looked like a giant coin.

Earth X
In the alternative future of Earth X, Norman Osborn's business ventures have completely taken over the United States. Citizens work in his businesses, shop in his stores and eat his food. Norman is the prime economic power and de facto ruler of the country. The Terrigen Mists have shaped his face into a saner version of his Goblin mask. He is partially responsible for the deaths of the Avengers as he sent them to battle a now Super Intelligent Absorbing Man. The Enforcers and The Vulture seem to serve as his secret service. He is later used as a pawn for the Red Skull, until Spiders Man makes him think he's with Gwen Stacy (in reality the Red Skull) who shoves him out the window where his foot catches on a flag and his neck snaps similar to how Gwen died. Unaware of the irony, Skull orders his corpse be brought back up so he can push him out again, just so he can make a "splat" sound.

Earth-812145
In the New Exiles comic series, Norman Osborn of Earth-812145 of the Marvel Universe is an insane criminal called The Gold Goblin. The Gold Goblin was stopped by the Exiles after he began to wreak havoc on his home world.

Ghost Goblin
An unidentified version of Norman Osborn operates as the Ghost Goblin where he possesses powers similar to Ghost Rider and throws flaming noggin bombs that are in the shape of a skull. He appears as a member of the Multiversal Masters of Evil. He accompanied Black Skull in attacking Captain America and Captain Marvel until Star Brand matures and drives them off.

At the time when Robbie Reyes and his Deathlok companion were apprehended by Black Skull's forces on Earth-818, Ghost Goblin visited Black Skull where they mentioned that they never saw a Ghost Rider ride a car before. This led to Black Skull's latest torture by having him kill whatever Robbie Reyes variants they can apprehend.

Ghost Goblin was present when the Multiversal Masters of Evil take over another world while planning to return to Earth-616. Just then, Ghost Rider shows up where he subdues Black Skull and King Killmonger. Ghost Goblin engages Ghost Rider next as his noggin bombs identify him as the All-Rider. Ghost Goblin is defeated. After Deathlok sacrifices his life so that Ant-Man of Earth-818 can get away, Doom Supreme states to the Multiversal Masters of Evil that he knows where they are going and that they should regroup. Ghost Goblin states that he should work on regaining his original size. Doom Supreme then states to the Multiversal Masters of Evil that they will commit one more slaughter at the specific loation before they return to Earth-616 as Doom Supreme vows to them that "No Avenger gets out alive".

Ghost Goblin was with the Multiversal Masters of Evil when they returned to Earth-616. He fights against Nighthawk and the Prehistoric Ghost Rider. During the fight, Ghost Goblin is depowered by the Prehistoric Ghost Rider who then kills him.

Heroes Reborn
In an alternate reality depicted in the 2021 "Heroes Reborn" miniseries, Norman Osborn operates as the Goblin, has Deadpool as a sidekick, and serves as Nighthawk's arch-nemesis. Years prior, Goblin killed Nighthawk's sidekick, Falcon, by throwing him off of the Chesapeake Bay Bridge in a similar fashion to Gwen Stacy's death in the main continuity. In the present, the Goblin orchestrates a prison break at Ravencroft Asylum to lure in Nighthawk and have the hero's partner, Dr. Gwen Stacy / Night-Gwen, kill him after exposing her to Goblin Gas. While Nighthawk saves Gwen and spares the Goblin, the villain commits suicide, revealing how the world has changed to Nighthawk.

Infinity Warps
During the "Infinity Wars" storyline, when the universe was folded, Norman Osborn got fused with Jack Russell to create Goblin by Night. Norman Russell was cursed to be the Goblin by Night and killed Ben Spector, May Spector, and nearly killed Peter Spector leaving Peter to become ArachKnight. During a battle with Peter, Norman was injured and was saved by his son, Harry Russell. While Harry was taking care of his father, Norman lost control and bit Harry, passing the curse to him. Harry now as the new Goblin by Night, starts using the Glider that Peter built for him prior to becoming the Goblin, leaving Norman free from the curse and being forgiven by Peter and decide to find a way to cure Harry.

Marvel Fairy Tales
In Spider-Man Fairy Tales #1 (an adaptation of Little Red Riding Hood) Osborn makes an appearance as one of the woodsmen in the employ of Jameson alongside Peter and Thompson. Norman Osborn and Harry Osborn also appear in issue four of Spider-Man Fairy Tales, a gender-swapped retelling of the story of Cinderella. Norman is the cruel guardian of Peter Parker, and his coat of arms and armor have a goblin/pumpkin motif.

Marvel Noir
In the Marvel Noir universe, Norman Osborn is a former circus freak who was mistreated by the audience for his reptile-like skin disorder. This fueled his ambitions in earning his "respect" by becoming the major Crime Lord in New York. He used a mask to hide his true appearance. Earning the name "the Goblin", he organized his group composing of former circus and carnival freak shows: Kraven the Hunter, Adrian Toomes, and Chameleon.

The Goblin's reputation earned him as a freelancer from among New York City's politicians and businessmen in hired to commit illegal acts such as suppressing public protests and even acts of assassinations on public objectors. These actions eventually caused him to come into conflict with Spider-Man after he order The Vulture to kill the vigilante's uncle. Later, reporter Ben Urich became a problem for Norman, so the mob boss sent The Chameleon dressed as J. Jonah Jameson to kill him as Osborn kidnapped the real one. After murdering Urich, the Chameleon was killed by Felicia Hardy.

The Goblin then took Felicia to one of his hideouts, only for Spider-Man track him down. Norman escaped to the sewers with Hardy as Spider-Man was fighting Osborn's thugs. During the battle, Kraven (one of the thugs) hit a glass full of spiders, causing the animals to fall on him. Spider-Man then saved Jameson and went after Osborn. New York City's vigilante and its main mob boss fought until each one of them got unmasked, Spider-Man was revealed to be Peter Parker and Osborn reveals his green and scaled skin to him. Parker decides not to kill Norman, however a spider-infested Kraven then shows up and attacks Osborn, apparently killing him.

Marvel Zombies
In the Marvel Zombies universe, a zombified Green Goblin appears attacking Galactus alongside several other undead supervillains. Also in Marvel Zombies: Dead Days, the zombified Green Goblin, alongside several other undead Spider-Man villains, appears to attack Wolverine and Magneto as the two are saving innocent civilians from zombies. An alternative version of the Green Goblin was also infected by a zombified Spider-Man, causing him to "participate" with other zombie members of the Sinister 6 into devouring Peter's friends. Grieving, dumb, angered, and devastated, the Zombie Spider-Man obliterates him along with the other undead Sinister 6 members.

MC2
In the MC2 universe, Norman Osborn is very much the same character from his 1996-1999 portion of the original 616 timeline, only in this universe, he abducts Peter's daughter Mayday Parker and leaves her in the care of Allison Mongraine. However, Peter's wayward original clone Kaine, along with a remorseful Mongraine, returns baby May to the Parkers.

Two years later, Norman would attempt to gain incredible power through the Gathering of Five, but in a final battle with Spider-Man, Osborn is slain in an explosion that also severely injures Peter, costing him one of his legs.

May would later become a hero in her own right named Spider-Girl.

After discovering a living twin of May Parker (kept in suspended animation) among his grandfather's possessions, Normie Osborn wondered whether it was a clone or whether the original Goblin had put the real May in suspended animation and arranged for her parents to receive a clone of May to raise. He visited Élan in prison and questioned her about this, but she refused to say anything. She was then later broken out of jail by an unknown benefactor, then she released the clone May on to the world and towards the original May. She also had Peter Parker kidnapped and brainwashed into thinking he was Norman Osborn. The brainwashed Peter joins with the May clone, who is half symbiote, and becomes the Goblin God. It is through this brainwashing that Norman Osborn's consciousness resurfaces.

In a psychic duel, Peter, Mayday, the clone and the spirit of Aunt May defeated Norman's psychic representation, which in turn cured Peter of his condition, ending Osborn's threat yet again.

Newspaper strip
In The Amazing Spider-Man newspaper strip by Stan Lee and Larry Lieber a brief flashback showed Spider-Man fighting the Green Goblin, designed similarly to the version in the Sam Raimi Spider-Man films, to save Mary Jane.

A later story showing Harry Osborn as the Hobgoblin flashed back to Norman Osborn's death in a battle against Spider-Man and showed Harry's realization that his father was the murderous Green Goblin.

Old Man Logan
On Earth-807128, Mysterio used an illusion of Green Goblin and other villains to trick Wolverine into killing the X-Men. There is also a location on the map in Ohio called Osborn City.

In the pages of "Old Man Logan" that takes place on Earth-21923, the illusion of Norman Osborn remains intact and that he also fought Spider-Man during the Battle of New York. In the pages of "Avengers of the Wastelands", it was revealed that Green Goblin rules a location in Ohio called Osborn City. When Danielle Cage's group arrive in Osborn Country, Green Goblin led Absorbing Man, Enchantress, MODOK, Shocker, and Wild Child in attacking them. While Viv Vision killed MODOK, Dwight Barrett used his Ant-Man helmet to summon a swarm of insects that kill Green Goblin and the villains with him.

Spider-Man: Clone Saga
In the retelling of the Clone Saga by Tom DeFalco, Norman did not survive his battle with Spider-Man following the death of Gwen Stacy. The Jackal plans to clone him as a plot to torment Ben Reilly and Peter Parker (though they are not aware of this) before he is murdered by Kaine. However, Harry Osborn, who is still alive in this reality, manages to obtain the clone pod and releases Norman. This clone is quite sane due to never being exposed to the goblin formula, and he makes repeated efforts to convince his insane son to stop his maniacal plans. He ultimately sacrifices himself to save the Parkers and baby May from Harry, who swears vengeance.

Spider-Man: Life Story
Spider-Man: Life Story features an alternate continuity where the characters naturally age when Peter debuted as Spider-Man in 1962. In 1966, Osborn loses his memories as the Green Goblin shortly after a fight with Spider-Man. While initially fearful of Osborn getting his memory back and revealing his secret identity, Peter later gives an anonymous tip to the police to get Osborn arrested and prevent the Green Goblin from hurting anyone.

In 1977, the still imprisoned Norman convinces Harry to suit up as the Black Goblin to steal "The Gemini Project" from Miles Warren, which is revealed to be a clone of himself. Harry discovers that Miles also cloned Peter and Gwen Stacy and deduces that Norman cloned Peter because he still considered Peter the more worthy heir. After Peter convinces Harry of his father's manipulations, Harry blows up the containment tubes the clones were in, killing all of them except for Peter's clone. However, Miles reveals that the Gwen in the containment tube was actually the real Gwen.

Norman is eventually released from prison and feigns his old age affecting his mental state before disappearing from the public. In 1995, he reveals Spider-Man's secret identity and information about his clone Ben Reilly to Doctor Octopus, who kidnaps them and threatens Harry into using Oscorp technology to study a way to clone himself. In the process, he discovers that Peter is supposedly the clone while Ben is the original. In the ensuing chaos, Doctor Octopus kills Harry after attempting to kill Peter and Ben. Peter allows Ben to take over his life in New York before tracking down Norman to an industrial area in New Jersey with Jessica Jones' help. Peter reveals he kept tabs on Norman after he was released from prison and knew Norman rigged the machines to trick Peter into thinking he was the clone. After learning of Harry's death from Peter, Norman blames Peter for the incident and tries to attack him, but then dies of a heart attack cursing Spider-Man.

Spider-Man Unlimited
The Spider-Man Unlimited comics that tie in with the series depict the Green Goblin's first encounter with Spider-Man, and their rescue of several Beastials and humans from Venom and Carnage's clutches. Later, the Goblin helps Spider-Man look in the sewers for the missing people that were kidnapped by an octopus-like creature. They fight the creature that took them to a place called "Heaven" where they were taken hostage by the villagers, but were rescued by a Counter-Earth version of Gwen Stacy that lived in this village.

Spider-Verse
There are different versions of Green Goblin in the Spider-Verse storyline:

 A version of the Sinister Six appears in Earth-803 calling themselves as the "Six Men of Sinestry" and is led by Norman Osborn under the disguise of Green Goblin. They battled Lady Spider and were forced to withdraw when they lost the upper hand, but they succeed in stealing the mayor's plans.
 In Earth-21205, the Green Goblin is murdered by Peter Parker in rage, resulting in Peter becoming a similarly costumed villain named "the Goblin" due to the trauma of Gwen Stacy's death.
 In Earth-138, Norman "Ozzy" Osborn is president of America and leads to wipe out the Anarchic Spider-Man and his Spider-Army. His company Oscorp created Variable Engagement Neuro-sensitive Organic Mesh or V.E.N.O.M. which is used by the Thunderbolt Department, the police and fire department of his regime. He and his Thunderbolt Department were defeated in the battle with Spider-Punk, Spider-Punk smashing Osborn's stomach with a guitar.
 In Earth-3145 where Spider-Man is Ben Parker, the Goblin version is called the Emerald Elf and was briefly shown in a flashback sequence as the killer of Ben's family. He is presumably killed when a scheme by Doctor Octopus resulted in a nuclear apocalypse.
 Different versions of the Goblin's identity appear including a Green Goblin which is part of Verna's Hounds. They are killed by Assassin Spider-Man, Superior Spider-Man, and Spider-Punk.

Spider-Geddon
 In the Spider-Geddon storyline, Norman Osborn of Earth-44145 is a six-armed version of Spider-Man. As Norman is informed of his son Harry Osborn moving through Oscorp and having been secretly armed, he is told that Harry is on the 15th floor near Mr. Warren's lab. Being Spider-Man and arriving where a warped Cosmic Cube is located, Norman confronts Harry who dons the Kobold armor. It was revealed during the fight that Norman killed Peter Parker as Harry fires a laser beam at the warped Cosmic Cube. As Oscorp starts to disintegrate, Norman is pleased that Harry finally gave him what he wanted by accidentally giving him access to the multiverse. Just then, Spider-Punk arrives and pulls Norman much to his dismay. Norman is among the spider-powered characters that are on Superior Spider-Man's team. After Superior Spider-Man's group rescues Miles Morales's group from the Inheritors at the New U Technologies building, Norman has a talk with Spiders-Man of Earth-11580 about his vision on the Web of Life and Destiny as they have a secret strategy to keep the Inheritors on Earth-616. After destroying the Web of Life along with Spiders-Man, he is seen holding a piece of the Web inside a container with an evil smile on his face. In the 2019 Superior Spider-Man series, he reappears on Earth-616, along with Spiders-Man who had been spying on Otto Octavius, while Norman plans his revenge. After taking a hostage, Osborn attempts to force Octavius to show his true colors by threatening to kill an innocent boy Octavius saved unless Octavius kills three civilians in the next few hours, forcing Octavius to make a literal deal with Mephisto to be returned to his original body and personality so that he can be ruthless enough to stop Osborn's plans, the restored Doctor Octopus throwing Osborn back to his world.
 In Ultimate Spider-Man: Web Warriors, Norman Osborn as Green Goblin (voiced by Steven Weber) further mutates himself into the Spider-Goblin after splicing himself with the DNA of interdimensional Spider-Men.
 In Marvel's Spider-Man, Norman Osborn (voiced by Josh Keaton) eventually mutates into the Spider King due to exposure to Raymond Warren's spider virus.
 During the return of the Inheritors, Spider-Gwen's device to travel through the multiverse got destroyed by Verna and then Spider-Gwen got stranded in an alternate universe. In this universe, Peter Parker and Gwen Stacy got a job at Oscorp and Peter wanted to create a cure for severe illness. Peter was experimenting with spider venom to create the cure but one of the spiders bit Harry Osborn instead, and thus is this universe's Spider-Man. Harry alongside Gwen as this universe's Green Goblin started to fight crime together, until during a fight with the Sandman, both Harry and Gwen's father got killed. After that, Gwen lost all of memories, forgetting about Peter and Mary Jane.
 On Earth-11580, another version of Green Goblin is seen alongside Hobgoblin, Demogoblin and Jack O'Lantern during the Goblin Night. Under the Goblin Queen's orders, they try to kill Gwen Stacy, but Spiders-Man arrives and defeats the Goblins.

Ultimate Marvel

The Ultimate Marvel version of Norman Osborn is a corrupt industrialist and scientist who is trying to perfect the Super Soldier drug for S.H.I.E.L.D., an obsession that leads to the neglect of his wife Martha Osborn and son Harry Osborn. When an OZ-injected spider bites Peter Parker on a field trip, and develops amazing abilities, Norman theorizes that if the OZ combined with spider DNA were behind Parker's abilities of a spider, then Norman with OZ combined with his own DNA would become a heightened version of himself. But his experiment goes wrong, and he himself is transformed into a muscular, grotesque, goblin-looking monster, granting him superhuman strength, reflexes, stamina, speed and durability, and enabling him to leap great distances. He is also pyrokinetic, as he can throw flaming balls of destructive energy. His alter-ego is later referred to as the "Green Goblin" by the public.

What If?
Norman Osborn has been featured in some "What If" stories:

 In a story that asks "What If Spider-Man Saved Gwen Stacy", Spider-Man jumped after Gwen Stacy when Green Goblin threw her off the Washington Bridge enabling Norman Osborn to leak Spider-Man's identity to the Daily Bugle.
 In a story that asks "What If Captain America Led All the Heroes Against the Superhero Registration Act", Green Goblin was among the villains that attacked the Sentinel O.N.E. Strikeforce. He was defeated by Captain America's group and was later attacked by Code Lightning (an army of Thor clones).
 In an alternate reality, Osborn acquired the Infinity Gems after manipulating an army of villains to do the work for him and used them to reassemble the Infinity Gauntlet, defeating most of the heroes while trapping Spider-Man in a time loop where he witnesses/"causes" Gwen Stacy's death over and over again. However, when Norman uses the Gauntlet's power to resurrect his abusive father to show him what he has accomplished, his father dismisses him as a petty tyrant and a monster until Norman uses the Gauntlet to change his father's opinion. When Thanos appears, killing the rest of the Dark Avengers while taunting Osborn about the hollow nature of his father's current approval, Osborn destroys him, but when his altered father only says that he loves Norman as a son, Osborn erases him in a fit of anger as he wanted to be praised for his accomplishments, realizing too late that erasing his father automatically erases him as well.

What The--?!
In Peter Porker the Spectacular Spider-Ham, Norman Osborn is a turkey and enemy to Spider-Ham calling himself the Green Gobbler.

Cultural impact and legacy

Popularity and critical response

Comics journalist and historian Mike Conroy writes of the character: "Of all the costumed villains who've plagued Spider-Man over the years, the most flat-out unhinged and terrifying of them all is the Green Goblin."

IGN ranked Norman as the thirteenth greatest comic book villain of all time being the seventh highest Marvel Comics supervillain on the list. They referenced storylines such as "The Night Gwen Stacy Died" and "Dark Reign" saga as one of his most prominent roles. While an ongoing comic book storyline during the time of the list, they praised his depiction in the "Dark Reign" saga stating that while he was once a great villain in his Green Goblin persona, he evolved past that when briefly being successful taking over S.H.I.E.L.D. and the Avengers on his own without the Green Goblin persona. IGN then ranked Osborn as the 13th greatest Marvel Comics supervillain in 2014. Stating that "no villain has taken so much from Peter Parker or left such a lasting impact on his life". IGN also ranked him as twenty fourth on their top 100 villains list in 2016 being the third highest Marvel Comics supervillain on the list after Magneto and Doctor Doom and the fifth highest comic book supervillain with DC Comics supervillains Joker and Lex Luthor being the only other higher ranked. IGN ranked him as the second greatest Spider-Man villain in 2014 only behind Doctor Octopus. His rivalry with Spider-Man is listed as the second greatest archenemies in comics.

Wizard magazine also ranked Norman's Green Goblin persona as the nineteenth greatest villain of all time with Galactus, Magneto and Doctor Doom being the only Marvel Comics characters higher on the list. They also placed him twenty eighth on the greatest comic book character list being the fifth highest supervillain only lower than Doctor Doom, Magneto, Joker and Luthor. Newsarama placed the Green Goblin as the second greatest Spider-Man villain of all time in 2017 behind Doctor Octopus. CollegeHumor ranked him as the fourteenth greatest comic book villain of all-time. Complex ranked him as seventh in the 100 greatest comic book villains of all time. WhatCulture named him as the seventeenth greatest comic book villains of all time. Screen Rant named him as the second best Spider-Man villain of all-time. Comicbook.com placed the character debut in the third place as the best Spider-Man villain. GamesRadar ranked him as the third in the top 50 greatest Spider-Man villains. ComicsAlliance ranked him as the number one greatest Spider-Man villain.

In 2020, CBR.com included Red Goblin in their "Spider-Man: The Best New Villains of the Century" list.

In 2020, CBR.com ranked Norman Osborn 1st in their "Marvel: Dark Spider-Man Villains, Ranked From Lamest To Coolest" list.

In 2022, Screen Rant ranked Red Goblin in their "10 Most Powerful Silk Villains In Marvel Comics" list.

In 2022, Screen Rant ranked Green Goblin 3rd in their "10 Most Powerful Silk Villains In Marvel Comics" list.

 In 2022, CBR.com ranked Green Goblin 2nd in their "10 Most Violent Spider-Man Villains" list.

In other media

Norman Osborn has appeared in comics, cartoons, films, video games, coloring books, novels, records, and children's books. Osborn also appeared in other print forms besides the comics, including novels, children's books, and the daily newspaper comic strip The Amazing Spider-Man, which debuted in January 1977, with the earliest installments written by Stan Lee and drawn by John Romita, Sr. Osborn has been adapted to other media including games, toys, collectibles, and miscellaneous memorabilia, and has appeared as the main character in numerous computer and video games on over 15 gaming platforms.

In television, he first was featured in the ABC animated series Spider-Man (1967–1970) and later on other animated series featuring the superhero include the syndicated Spider-Man (1981–1982), Spider-Man and His Amazing Friends (1981–1983), Fox Kids' Spider-Man (1994–1998), Spider-Man Unlimited (1999–2000), Spider-Man: The New Animated Series (2003), The Spectacular Spider-Man (2008–2009), Ultimate Spider-Man (2012–2017), Marvel Disk Wars: The Avengers (2014–2015), and Spider-Man (2017–present). Osborn will also appear in the upcoming series Spider-Man: Freshman Year (2024), which is part of the Marvel Cinematic Universe (MCU) franchise.

Norman was featured in a trilogy of live-action films directed by Sam Raimi and played by Willem Dafoe. He was the main antagonist in the first film (2002), and later made cameo appearances in Spider-Man 2 (2004) and Spider-Man 3 (2007) as a hallucination. Marc Webb's The Amazing Spider-Man film reboot (2012) featured many references to the character who appeared in the sequel The Amazing Spider-Man 2 (2014) portrayed by Chris Cooper. Dafoe reprised the role, again as the main antagonist, in the Marvel Cinematic Universe film Spider-Man: No Way Home (2021).

Osborn was one of the characters portrayed in the 1987 live adaptation of Spider-Man's wedding at Shea Stadium. Osborn appeared as the main antagonist in the Broadway musical Spider-Man: Turn Off the Dark, began previews on November 14, 2010 at the Foxwoods Theatre on Broadway, with the official opening night on June 14, 2011. He also appears in the 2014 Marvel Universe Live! stage show.

Collected editions

References

External links
 
 The Green Goblins Hideout
 
 Norman Osborn at Comicvine

Action film villains
Villains in animated television series
Characters created by Stan Lee
Characters created by Steve Ditko
Comics characters introduced in 1964
Experimental medical treatments in fiction
Fictional business executives
Fictional characters from Connecticut
Fictional characters from New York City
Fictional characters with bipolar disorder
Fictional characters with dissociative identity disorder
Fictional child abusers
Fictional engineers
Fictional goblins
Fictional inventors
Fictional mass murderers
Fictional prison escapees
Fictional white-collar criminals
Green Goblin
Marvel Comics characters with accelerated healing
Marvel Comics characters with superhuman strength
Marvel Comics film characters
Marvel Comics mutates
Marvel Comics scientists
Marvel Comics supervillains
S.H.I.E.L.D. agents
Spider-Man characters
Video game bosses

de:Figuren aus dem Marvel-Universum#Grüner Kobold